Susan C. Strickler is an American television, documentary and theatre director. She has been nominated for three Daytime Emmys (1992, 1993, 2005) and won once in 1992. She was also nominated for two Directors Guild of America Awards and won once in 1992. The DGA win was shared with Mary Madeiras, Dennis Cameron, Cynthia Flood Jacobsen, Arthur Lewis and Karen Wilkins.

Directing/Producing credits
"The Vow From Hiroshima" (2020) Full Length Documentary (https://www.bullfrogcommunities.com/thevowfromhiroshima)
The Young and the Restless (September 2007 – 2009)
All My Children (2004–2005)
Guiding Light (1997–2005)
13 Bourbon Street (Producer 1996)
One Life to Live (1995–1997)
General Hospital (1994)
Valley of the Dolls (1994)
Another World (Producer: 1987–1991) (Director 1991–1993)

References

External links
 
 Hollywood Reporter
 StoneStreetStudios
 www.vnuemedia.com

American soap opera writers
American television directors
American television producers
American women television producers
American theatre directors
Women theatre directors
American women television directors
Living people
Soap opera producers
Place of birth missing (living people)
Year of birth missing (living people)
Directors Guild of America Award winners
American women television writers
Women soap opera writers
21st-century American women